was a railway station in Oshamambe, Hokkaido, Japan, operated by the Hokkaido Railway Company (JR Hokkaido). Opened in 1904, it closed in March 2017.

Lines
It was numbered S31.

Station layout
Warabitai Station has a single side platform serving a single track.

History
The station opened on October 15, 1904, as a Hokkaido railway line station. On July 1, 1907, with the nationalization of Hokkaido Railway, the station was transferred to the state-owned railway.

Freight handling at the station was discontinued on February 7, 1975, and luggage handling was discontinued on February 1, 1984. It was destaffed in 1986.

With the privatization of Japanese National Railways (JNR) on 1 April 1987, the station came under the control of JR Hokkaido.

Closure
The station closed following the last day of services on 3 March 2017.

Passenger statistics
In fiscal 1992, the station was used by an average of 8 passengers daily.

Origin of name
The name is deriveｄ from the Ainu word . The station name is also the last JR station name when arranged in the Gojuon order.

Surrounding area
  National Route 5
 Mount Kuromatsunai
 Niseko Bus "Warabidai" bus stop

See also
 List of railway stations in Japan

References

Railway stations in Hokkaido Prefecture
Stations of Hokkaido Railway Company
Railway stations in Japan opened in 1904
Railway stations closed in 2017
2017 disestablishments in Japan